Taijiang District (Foochow Romanized: Dài-gĕ̤ng) is one of 6 urban districts of the prefecture-level city of Fuzhou, the capital of Fujian Province, China.

The district has the headquarters of the fast food chain CNHLS (originally "Wallace").

Administrative divisions
Subdistricts:
Chating Subdistrict, Yangzhong Subdistrict, Cangxia Subdistrict, Yizhou Subdistrict, Shanghai Subdistrict, Yingzhou Subdistrict, Xingang Subdistrict, Houzhou Subdistrict, Aofeng Subdistrict, Ninghua Subdistrict

References

External links

 

County-level divisions of Fujian
Fuzhou